In Greek mythology, Amphithemis (Ancient Greek: Ἀμφίθεμις), was the name of the following characters:
 Amphithemis, also called Garamas (Γαράμαντά), son of Apollo and Acalle, daughter of Minos. He was born in Libya, to where Minos had banished his pregnant daughter, Acacallis in retribution for her having an illicit relationship. Amphithemis consorted with Libyan lake nymph Tritonis who bore him two sons, Nasamon and Caphaurus. This Caphaurus, also known as Cephalion, was a shepherd who slew the Argonauts Eurybate (son of Teleon) and Canthus after they plundered his flocks. In some stories, Amphithemis was the first mortal born. The Libyans claimed that Garamas was born before the Hundred-handed Ones and that, when he rose from the plain, he offered Mother Earth a sacrifice of the sweet acorn.
 Amphithemis, one of the horned Lamian Centaurs or Lamian Pheres, offspring of the Lamusides nymphs.

Notes

References 

 Apollonius Rhodius, Argonautica translated by Robert Cooper Seaton (1853-1915), R. C. Loeb Classical Library Volume 001. London, William Heinemann Ltd, 1912. Online version at the Topos Text Project.
 Apollonius Rhodius, Argonautica. George W. Mooney. London. Longmans, Green. 1912. Greek text available at the Perseus Digital Library.
 Gaius Julius Hyginus, Fabulae from The Myths of Hyginus translated and edited by Mary Grant. University of Kansas Publications in Humanistic Studies. Online version at the Topos Text Project.
 Graves, Robert, The Greek Myths, Harmondsworth, London, England, Penguin Books, 1960. 
Graves, Robert, The Greek Myths: The Complete and Definitive Edition. Penguin Books Limited. 2017. 
Nonnus of Panopolis, Dionysiaca translated by William Henry Denham Rouse (1863-1950), from the Loeb Classical Library, Cambridge, MA, Harvard University Press, 1940.  Online version at the Topos Text Project.
 Nonnus of Panopolis, Dionysiaca. 3 Vols. W.H.D. Rouse. Cambridge, MA., Harvard University Press; London, William Heinemann, Ltd. 1940-1942. Greek text available at the Perseus Digital Library.

Centaurs
Children of Apollo
Demigods in classical mythology
Libyan characters in Greek mythology